Frederick Almor Williams (June 13, 1878 – January 31, 1962) was an American football coach.  He was the second head football coach for Emporia State University in Emporia, Kansas and he held that position for the 1901 season. His record at Emporia State was 2–6–1.

Williams was later an attorney in Oregon. He died at Marion, Oregon in 1962.

Head coaching record

References

1878 births
1962 deaths
19th-century players of American football
Emporia State Hornets football coaches
Iowa Hawkeyes football players
Northern Iowa Panthers football coaches
Oregon lawyers
People from Harrison County, Iowa
Coaches of American football from Iowa
Players of American football from Iowa